The following is the list of ships of the Royal Indian Navy, in existence from 1934 to 1950, when it was renamed the Indian Navy. Several of the vessels listed below were transferred to the Royal Pakistani Navy in 1947. Vessels are organized by type.

For a more complete list of ships of the Indian Navy since its inception, see List of ships of the Indian Navy.

Cruisers
 INS Delhi (C74)
INS Mysore(67)

Destroyers
 INS Rajput (D141)
 INS Ranjit (D209)
 INS Rana (D115)

Frigates
 
 HMIS Tamar (K262)
 HMIS Neza (K239)
 
 HMIS Dhanush (K265)
 HMIS Kukri (K243)
 HMIS Hooghly (K330)

Corvettes

Sloops
 HMIS Baluchi (PC.55)
 
 
 
 HMIS Elphinstone 
 
 
 
 
 
 
 
 HMIS Pathan (K26)

Minesweepers

Amphibious warfare ships

Harbour Tankers

Auxiliary Patrol Vessels

 
Royal Indian Navy